Vladimir Georgiev may refer to:
 Vladimir I. Georgiev (1908–1986), Bulgarian linguist, philologist, and educational administrator
 Vladimir Georgiev (chess player) (born 1975), Bulgarian chess player